Inga Dudchenko (born 28 May 1988) is a Kazakhstani rower. She competed in the women's single sculls event at the 2008 Summer Olympics.

References

1988 births
Living people
Kazakhstani female rowers
Olympic rowers of Kazakhstan
Rowers at the 2008 Summer Olympics
Sportspeople from Karaganda
Asian Games medalists in rowing
Rowers at the 2006 Asian Games
Asian Games bronze medalists for Kazakhstan
Medalists at the 2006 Asian Games
21st-century Kazakhstani women